This is a list of notable events in music that took place in the year 1987.

Specific locations
1987 in British music
1987 in Norwegian music

Specific genres
1987 in country music
1987 in heavy metal music
1987 in hip hop music
1987 in jazz

Events

January–February
January 3 – Aretha Franklin becomes the first woman inducted into the Rock and Roll Hall of Fame. The other inductees this year consist of The Coasters, Eddie Cochran, Bo Diddley, Marvin Gaye, Bill Haley, Clyde McPhatter, Ricky Nelson, Roy Orbison, Carl Perkins, Smokey Robinson and Jackie Wilson.
January 5 – Elton John, after several months of voice problems, undergoes throat surgery in an Australian hospital. The outcome would hinder his voice permanently and he would soon start singing in a deep register.
January 16 – Beastie Boys become the first act to be censored by American Bandstand.
January 24 – Steve "Silk" Hurley's innovative "Jack Your Body" becomes the first house music record to top the UK singles chart.
February 6 – Sonny Bono announces his candidacy for mayor of Palm Springs, California.
February 14
Bon Jovi's "Livin' on a Prayer" reaches #1 in the USA. It would be 1987's biggest hit song worldwide.
Los Angeles radio station KMET signs off after nineteen years on the air. The station had been a pioneer of underground progressive rock programming.
February 15 – Video Hits premieres on Australian television.
February 24 – The 29th Annual Grammy Awards are presented in Los Angeles, hosted by Billy Crystal. Paul Simon's Graceland wins Album of the Year, Steve Winwood's "Higher Love" wins Record of the Year and Dionne Warwick's cover of "That's What Friends Are For", featuring Elton John, Gladys Knight and Stevie Wonder, wins Song of the Year. Bruce Hornsby & the Range win Best New Artist.
February 26 – The first four Beatles albums, Please Please Me, With the Beatles, A Hard Day's Night and Beatles for Sale are released on compact disc. Capitol Records decides to release the original UK mixes of the Beatles albums, which means that the first four CDs are released in mono. This marks the first time that many of these mono mixes are available in the US.

March–April
March 9
U2 releases The Joshua Tree, an album that launches them into superstar status in the music world.  The album would sell over 14 million copies worldwide in 1987 alone and would win the Grammy for "Album of the Year" (at the 1988 ceremony).  U2 have two #1 hit songs from this album on the U.S. Billboard Hot 100 charts.
Carole King is inducted into the Songwriters Hall of Fame in New York City.
The career that would end in an infamous appearance at The Brit awards and the burning of a million pounds began in Britain, as The Justified Ancients of Mu Mu release their debut single, "All You Need Is Love".
March 13
Bob Seger and the Silver Bullet Band receive a star on the Hollywood Walk of Fame.
In the US, Bryan Adams' "Heat of the Night" becomes the first single to be commercially released on cassette. Cassette singles become known as cassingles.
March 27 – Inspired by The Beatles' 1969 rooftop concert, U2 shoots a music video for the song "Where the Streets Have No Name" on a rooftop in Los Angeles.
April 23 — Carole King sues the owner of her record company, Lou Adler, claiming that she is owed more than $400,000 in royalties. King also asks for rights to her old recordings.

May–August
May 9 – Ireland's Johnny Logan wins the Eurovision Song Contest, held in Brussels, Belgium, with the song "Hold Me Now", making him the first artist to win the contest twice.  The song tops the charts in Ireland, and peaks at No. 2 in the UK.
June 14 – Madonna starts her Who's That Girl Tour in Osaka, Japan.
June 27 – Whitney Houston's second album Whitney becomes the first album by a female artist to debut at #1 on the Billboard 200.
July 4 
Kylie Minogue's recording career begins with the release of her cover version of the Little Eva hit The Loco-Motion; the single spends seven weeks at number one in her native Australia and leads to a contract with UK-based record producers Stock Aitken Waterman.
The first joint rock concert between the United States and the Soviet Union is held in Moscow to promote peace. The Doobie Brothers, James Taylor, Santana and Bonnie Raitt share the bill with Soviet rock group Autograph.
July 21 – American rock group Guns N' Roses release Appetite for Destruction which, after initial slow sales, will become the best-selling debut album of all time, with more than 18 million copies sold in the US alone to date.
August 1
Dave Stewart of Eurythmics and Siobhan Fahey of Bananarama are married in Normandy, France.
MTV Europe is launched. The first video played is "Money for Nothing" by Dire Straits.
August 3 – Def Leppard releases Hysteria, the longest rock album ever released as a single LP or cassette.
August 27 – The Jello Biafra criminal trial is dismissed after ending in a hung jury in Los Angeles court. Biafra and his manager had been charged with distributing harmful material to minors due to a poster included in the Dead Kennedys' Frankenchrist album of a painting depicting rows of sexual organs.
August 31 – Michael Jackson releases Bad, his first studio album since Thriller, the best-selling album of all time. The album would produce five number one singles in the US, a record which has not been broken.

September–October
September 3 – Fugazi plays their first live show (as a three-piece; Guy Picciotto had not joined the band yet) at the Wilson Center in Washington DC.
September 6 – Madonna ends her Who's That Girl Tour in Florence, Italy.
September 7 – Pink Floyd release A Momentary Lapse of Reason, their first album after the departure of, and legal battle with, bassist Roger Waters. The subsequent tour grossed around $135 million worldwide, a sum that was only equaled by the earnings of Michael Jackson and U2 combined.
September 11 – Reggae musician Peter Tosh is murdered during a robbery in his home.
September 12 – Michael Jackson starts the Bad World Tour, supporting his Bad album.
September 25 – CBS launches an American version of the long-running UK television show Top of the Pops. It lasts one year.
October 4 – Electronic data gathering completely replaces the old sales diary technique in compiling the UK singles and albums chart. The publication day of new charts is moved from Tuesday to Sunday.
October 8 – Chuck Berry receives a star on the Hollywood Walk of Fame.
October 19 – Mötley Crüe release the song "You're All I Need" as a single. MTV refuse to play its video because of the level of violence.
October 19 – INXS releases KICK.
October 30 – George Michael releases his first solo studio album, Faith, which would win the Grammy Award for album of the year and sell 11 million copies in the USA alone.
October 31 – The Zorros headline on Halloween for the last-ever show at the Crystal Ballroom, Melbourne's premier Punk/New Wave venue. The Crystal Ballroom has seen almost ten years of intense musical evolution. The venue has chandeliers, stained glass windows, paisley wallpaper and a tiled foyer.

November–December
November 2 – Dokken released Back for the Attack. 
November 13 – Sonny and Cher reunite for a performance on Late Night with David Letterman.
November 18 – CBS Records is sold to the Sony Corporation in a deal worth about $2 billion; the company was renamed Sony Music Entertainment in 1991.
November 19 – Cher returns to the music after five years of absence - time that she took to dedicate herself to the filmmaking business - with the lead single of her second self-titled album (and eighteenth overall), "I Found Someone", which peaked at number five in UK and number ten in US.
November 24 – ABC airs Rolling Stone Magazine's 20 Years of Rock 'n' Roll television special, chronicling the music and the people of the past twenty years to commemorate the 20th anniversary of Rolling Stone magazine. The special includes new interviews as well as vintage performance footage of many rock legends such as Jimi Hendrix, The Doors, The Rolling Stones, David Bowie, Sex Pistols, Bruce Springsteen and many more.
December 16 – John Mellencamp performs two free shows in the small town of Chillicothe, Ohio after one-fifth of the population signs a petition asking him to play.
December 23
 Nikki Sixx of the rock band Mötley Crüe suffers a heroin overdose, but is revived shortly thereafter.
 Roger Waters finalizes his departure from British progressive rock band Pink Floyd, after a two-year-long legal dispute over the rights to the band's name and assets.
December 31 – The sixteenth annual New Year's Rockin' Eve special airs on ABC, with appearances by Lisa Lisa & Cult Jam, Los Lobos, Barry Manilow, Restless Heart and The Temptations.

Also in 1987
Andreas Kisser replaces Jairo Guedes in Sepultura.
Prince cancels The Black Album just before its release. It becomes officially available in 1994.
Naxos Records is established as a budget classical music CD label by Klaus Heymann, a German-born resident of Hong Kong.

Bands formed
See Musical groups established in 1987

Bands disbanded
See Musical groups disestablished in 1987

Bands reformed
The Doobie Brothers
Lynyrd Skynyrd
Prism

Albums released

January–March

April–June

July–September

October–December

Release date unknown

2X4 – Guadalcanal Diary
25 Years Celebration – The Dubliners
Akwaba Beach – Mory Kanté
All Our Love - Gladys Knight & the Pips
Angel with a Lariat – k.d. lang and the Reclines 
Annihilate This Week (EP) – Black Flag
At My Window – Townes Van Zandt
Babble – That Petrol Emotion
Back Again in the DHSS - Half Man Half Biscuit
Ballot Result – Minutemen
Between Two Worlds – Patrick O'Hearn
Bennett/Berlin – Tony Bennett
The Best of A Flock of Seagulls – A Flock of Seagulls  
The Best of Dalida, Vol. 2 – Dalida (compilation)
Bird Dog – The Verlaines
The Blanton-Webster Years – Duke Ellington
Brave Words – The Chills
Brenda K. Starr – Brenda K. Starr
By the Light of the Moon – Los Lobos
The Camera Never Lies – Michael Franks
The Champion – Carman (singer)
The Cowboy Way – Riders in the Sky
D & K – DeGarmo and Key
Daddy's Highway – The Bats
Dancing with Strangers – Chris Rea
Dawn – Current 93
Dead Zone: The Grateful Dead CD Collection (1977-1987) – Grateful Dead
Desire – Toyah
Diminuendo – Lowlife
Drive by Shooting (EP) – Henry Rollins
Emergency Broadcast – White Heart
Escape from Noise – Negativland
Exiles – Dan Fogelberg
Eye of the Hurricane – The Alarm
Frozen Ghost – Frozen Ghost
Gluey Porch Treatments – Melvins
Green Eggs and Crack – Too Much Joy
Hai Hai – Roger Hodgson
Hot Animal Machine – Henry Rollins
Huevos – Meat Puppets
Hot Number – The Fabulous Thunderbirds
I Predict 1990 – Steve Taylor
If I Were Your Woman – Stephanie Mills
In Dreams: The Greatest Hits – Roy Orbison – compilation
I Prefer The Moonlight – Kenny Rogers
Kane Roberts – Kane Roberts (Alice Cooper guitarist's solo debut)
Law of the Fish – The Radiators
Life Time – Rollins Band

Life's a Bitch – Raven
Live and Loud!! – Sham 69 – Live
Live At The Ritz – Ronnie Wood & Bo Diddley – Live
Lone Star State of Mind – Nanci Griffith
Lubricated Goat Plays the Devil's Music (debut) – Lubricated Goat
Maggots: The Record – Plasmatics
Menjaring Matahari – Ebiet G. Ade
Mirador – Magnum
Official Version – Front 242
One Thousand Years of Trouble – Age of Chance
Out of Silence – Yanni
Où veux tu qu'je r'garde - Noir Désir
Pain of Mind - Neurosis
Players – Too Short 
Pontiac – Lyle Lovett 
Poem of the River – Felt
Post-Mersh Vol. 1 – Minutemen
Post-Mersh Vol. 2 – Minutemen
Powder Keg - Charlie Daniels
Romeo at Juilliard – Don Dixon
Saddle Pals – Riders in the Sky
Safety In Numbers – David Van Tieghem
See How We Are – X
Shaka Zulu – Ladysmith Black Mambazo
Silence – Stephan Eicher
Simply Shadows – The Shadows
Songs from the Stage and Screen – Michael Crawford
The Sound of Music – The dB's
Soy Así – José José
Speed Metal Symphony – Cacophony
Starting Up – Roy Wood
Stereoland – The Modern Art
Stinkfist – Clint Ruin and Lydia Lunch
Strange Cargo – William Orbit   
Swing Street – Barry Manilow
Taj - Taj Mahal
The Talking Animals – T-Bone Burnett
This Means War! – Petra (band)
Too Late To Cry – Alison Krauss
The Tribe – Bernie Taupin
Trouble Over Here - Trouble Funk
VI – Circle Jerks
Wasted...Again – Black Flag
Whistlin' in the Dark – Bryan Duncan
Whitecross – Whitecross
Wildest Dreams – Saga
Young and Free – Rock Goddess

Biggest hit singles
The following songs achieved the highest chart positions
in the charts of 1987.

Top 40 Chart hit singles

Other Chart hit singles

Notable singles

Other Notable singles

Published popular music
 "Last Midnight" w.m. Stephen Sondheim
 "Children Will Listen" w.m. Stephen Sondheim
 "Rhythm Is Gonna Get You" w.m. Gloria Estefan & E. E. Garcia
 "(I've Had) The Time of My Life" w.m. Franke Previte, Donald Markowitz & John DeNicola

Classical music
Pascal Bentoiu – Symphony No. 8 ("Imagini"), Op. 30
John Cage – As Slow as Possible
Mario Davidovsky – Quartet for flute, violin, viola and violoncello
James Dillon - Helle Nacht, large orchestra (90 players)
Joël-François Durand – Lichtung
Petr Eben – Job, for organ
Philip Feeney – Mémoire imaginaire (ballet)
Morton Feldman
Samuel Beckett, Words and Music, for 2 flutes, vibraphone, piano, violin, viola, and cello
For Samuel Beckett, for 23 instruments
Piano, Violin, Viola, Cello
Brian Ferneyhough - Third String Quartet
Lorenzo Ferrero
Ostinato
Non parto, non resto
Malcolm Forsyth – Songs from the Qu'appelle Valley
Karel Goeyvaerts – Aanloop en kreet (Run and Cry), for symphony orchestra and chorus
Henryk Górecki - Totus Tuus, Op. 60
Sofia Gubaidulina
String Quartet No. 2
String Quartet No. 3
Toshio Hosokawa - Ferne Landschaft I
György Kurtág
Kafka-Fragmente for soprano and violin
Requiem for a Friend to Poems by Rimma Dalos
Helmut Lachenmann - Staub for orchestra
Francisco Llácer Pla – Ricercare Concertante
Philippe Manoury - Jupiter for flute and live electronics, op. 15a
Nicholas Maw – Odyssey
Conlon Nancarrow - String Quartet #3
Luigi Nono
1° Caminantes…..Ayacucho, for alto, flute, small and large chorus, organ, orchestra and live electronics
2° No hay caminos, hay que caminar.....Andrej Tarkowskij, for seven ensembles
Post-prae-ludium No. 1 per Donau, for tuba and live electronics
Découvrir la subversion. Hommage à Edmond Jabès, for alto, narrator, flute, tuba, French horn and live electronics
Per Nørgård - Violin Concerto No. 1 Helle Nacht
Henri Pousseur – Traverser la forêt
Wolfgang Rihm
Klangbeschreibung I
Klangbeschreibung II
Klangbeschreibung III
Kaija Saariaho - Nymphéa, for string quartet and electronics
Somei Satoh - Stabat Mater
Ahmed Adnan Saygun – Cello Concerto
Byambasuren Sharav – Symphony No. 2
Juan Maria Solare – Doce variaciones 1987 (for piano)
Toru Takemitsu
All in Twilight
I Hear the Water Dreaming
Signals from Heaven
Joan Tower – Fanfare for the Uncommon Woman No. 1 
Galina Ustvolskaya - Symphony No. 4 - Prayer, for contralto, piano, trumpet and tam-tam
Kevin Volans - String Quartet No. 2 Hunting: Gathering
Iannis Xenakis
Ata, for orchestra
À r. (Hommage à Ravel), for piano 
Jalons, for piccolo, oboe, bass clarinet, doublebass clarinet, contrabassoon, horn, trumpet, trombone, tuba, harp, string quintet
Kassandra, for baritone/psalterion and percussion
XAS, for saxophone quartet
Taurhiphanie, 2-track
Tracées, for orchestra

Opera
John Adams – Nixon in China
Friedrich Cerha – Der Rattenfänger (The Pied Piper)
Michael Nyman – Vital Statistics
Judith Weir – A Night at the Chinese Opera, 8 July, Everyman Theatre, Cheltenham, England

Jazz

Musical theater

Abyssinia, with music by Ted Kociolek and lyrics by James Racheff – Off-Broadway production at the CSC Repertory Theater
Up on the Roof by Simon Moore and Jane Prowse—Portsmouth, UK production
Roza, with music by Gilbert Bécaud and lyrics and book by Julian More based on Romain Gary's novel La vie devant soi – Broadway production opened at the Royale Theatre and closed after only 10 days
 Anything Goes – Broadway revival
 Bless the Bride – West End revival
 Cabaret (Kander and Ebb) – Broadway revival
 Dreamgirls – Broadway revival
 Into the Woods – Broadway production opened at the Martin Beck Theatre and ran for 765 performances
 Les Misérables – Broadway production opened at The Broadway Theatre and ran for a total of 6680 performances, the second-longest run of any Broadway musical after Cats
 Oil City Symphony – off-Broadway production ran for 626 performances
 Stardust musical by Mitchell Parish opens at Biltmore Theater NYC for 102 performances
 Starlight Express (Andrew Lloyd Webber and Richard Stilgoe) – Broadway production opened at the Gershwin Theatre and ran for 761 performances

Musical films
 Aria
 Dirty Dancing
 Hail! Hail! Rock 'n' Roll
 Hearts of Fire
 La Bamba
 Mr. India
 Rock 'n' Roll Nightmare
 Sign o' the Times
 Testimony

Births
January 2 – Syesha Mercado, American singer and actress
January 7 – Sirusho, Armenian singer
January 9 – Paolo Nutini, British singer
January 12 
 Sunday (Jin Bo-ra), Korean pop singer (TSZX The Grace)
 Naya Rivera, American actress and singer (d. 2020)
January 16 – Jake Epstein, Canadian actor and singer
January 18 – Stefan Filipović, Montenegrin pop singer
January 19 – Rahma Riad, Iraqi singer
January 22 – Angel Olsen, American folk and indie rock singer
January 27 
  Katy Rose, American singer, songwriter, producer, musician and actress
 Ashley Grace, American singer-songwriter (Ha*Ash)
January 31 – Marcus Mumford, British singer, songwriter, musician and producer
February 1 – Heather Morris, American actress, dancer, singer and model
February 2
 Heather Bright,  American pop singer, songwriter, DJ and record producer.
 Victoria Song, Chinese pop singer (f(x)) 
February 3 – Elvana Gjata, Albanian singer 
February 5 – Darren Criss, American actor, singer and songwriter
February 6 – DJ Raiden, Korean DJ and producer
February 7 
 Kerli, Estonian singer and songwriter
 Monika Brodka, Polish singer
February 10 
 Choi Si Won, Korean actor and pop singer
 Poli Genova, Bulgarian singer and TV presenter
February 12 – O'Ryan (Browner), American R&B singer
February 17 – Lee Bo-ram, K-pop singer (SeeYa)
February 23 – Ab-Soul, American rapper (Black Hippy)
February 24 – Kim Kyu-jong, Korean pop singer (SS501)
February 25 – Eva Avila, Canadian singer-songwriter
March 1 – Kesha, American singer-songwriter, author, activist, musician
March 4 – Aja Volkman,  American singer, songwriter, and musician.
March 8 - Tobe Nwigwe, American rapper, singer and actor 
March 9 – Bow Wow, American hip-hop artist, actor
March 10 
 Emeli Sandé, Scottish singer and songwriter
 Mod Sun, American singer, songwriter, multi-instrumentalist and rapper, Member of Four Letter Lie and Scary Kids Scaring Kids (Dated and Worked with Avril Lavigne,  worked with Travis Barker, Bella Thorn, Tana Mongeau,  Dove Cameron, Megan Fox, Becky G and blackbear) 
March 12 – Hiroomi Tosaka, Japanese singer
March 20 – Jonas Rivanno, Indonesian actor, model and singer
March 26 – YUI, Japanese pop singer
March 27 – Polina Gagarina, Russian singer, songwriter, actress, and model
March 31 – Jeff Montalvo (Seven Lions), American electronic music producer
April 3 – 
 Park Jung-min, Korean pop singer (SS501)
 Rachel Bloom, American actress, comedian, singer, writer, producer, songwriter, and mental health activist
April 9
Jesse McCartney, American singer, songwriter, musician, voice actor and actor
Jazmine Sullivan, American singer
April 10 – Hayley Westenra, New Zealand soprano singer
April 11 
Lights (musician), Canadian singer and songwriter
Joss Stone, English soul singer-songwriter
April 12 – Brendon Urie, American vocalist and musician
April 15 – Iyaz, British Virgin Islands singer
April 17 – Jacqueline MacInnes Wood,  Canadian actress, disc jockey, singer and television host
April 18 – Samantha Jade, Australian singer and actress
April 20 − Anna Rossinelli, Swiss singer-songwriter
April 21 − Anastasia Prikhodko, Ukrainian folk rock and traditional pop singer
April 23 – Laura Mvula, British recording artist, songwriter and pianist. 
April 30 – Nikki Webster, Australian pop singer/businesswoman/actress
May 2 – Nana Kitade, Japanese singer
May 4 – Anjeza Shahini, Albanian singer
May 7 – Asami Konno, Japanese singer
May 13
 Hunter Parrish, American actor and singer
 Candice King, American actress and singer
 Charlotte Wessels, Dutch singer-songwriter (Delain, Phantasma, Kamelot) 
May 15
 Ammo (musician), American record producer and songwriter
 Jennylyn Mercado, Filipina actress, singer, television personality
May 16 – Can Bonomo, Turkish-Jewish singer
May 18 – Luisana Lopilato, an Argentine actress, singer and model (Michael Buble) 
May 21 – Hit-Boy, American record producer, rapper, singer and songwriter
May 24 – Jimena Barón, Argentine actress and singer
May 29 – Ak'Sent, American rapper
June 2 – Matthew Koma, American songwriter-singer, DJ, record producer (Married to Hilary Duff) 
June 8 – Ty Segall, American multi-instrumentalist, singer-songwriter and record producer
June 10 – Dotter, Swedish singer-songwriter
June 16 – Diana DeGarmo, American Idol contestant, singer
 Ali Stroker, American musician, singer, actress and advocate
June 17 – Kendrick Lamar, American rapper and songwriter (Black Hippy)
June 19 – Miho Fukuhara, Japanese singer and actress (Sweetbox)
June 21 
 Khatia Buniatishvili, Georgian pianist
 Kim Ryeowook, Korean pop singer (Super Junior)
June 23 – Caitlin Rose, American country singer
June 27 – Tomoya Kanki, Japanese musician (One Ok Rock)
July 1 – Yoga Lin, Taiwanese pop singer, One Million Star, Season 1 winner
July 4 – Jah Prayzah, Zimbabwean musician
July 6 – Kate Nash, English pop singer-songwriter and musician
July 9 – Rebecca Sugar, American animator, director, screenwriter, producer, and songwriter
July 11 – Shigeaki Kato, Japanese singer and actor (NEWS and K.K.Kity)
July 13 – Eva Rivas, Russian-Armenian singer
July 14 – 
Drew Fortier, American musician, songwriter, filmmaker, and actor
Dan Reynolds, American singer-songwriter, activist (Imagine Dragons and Egyptian)
 Peter Vives, Spanish actor, singer and classical pianist
July 17 
Chloe Lowery, American singer-songwriter
Jeremih, American recording artist and producer
July 19 – Nicola Benedetti, Scottish violinist
July 23 – Felipe Dylon, Brazilian singer
July 25
Alan Dawa Dolma (better known as "Alan"), Chinese singer
Jax Jones, English singer, producer and DJ
Gor Sujyan, Armenian rock singer, lead singer of Dorians
July 26 – Evelina Sašenko-Statulevičienė, Lithuanian jazz singer of Polish-Ukrainian descent
July 30 – Elise Estrada, Canadian singer
 August 2
 Nayer, American pop singer
 Jessie Daniels, American actress, songwriter, and musician
August 3 – Kim Hyung-jun, South Korean singer and DJ
August 6 – Aditya Narayan, Bollywood actor and singer
August 9, Noonie Boa,  Swedish singer, songwriter and record producer. 
 August 19 - John Ryan (musician), also known as John the Blind and JRY, is an American singer, songwriter, record producer, and multi-instrumentalist (Niall Horan, Sabrina Carpenter, One Direction, De;ta  Goodrem)  
August 21 – Kim Kibum, Korean actor and pop singer
August 24 – Daichi Miura, Japanese singer-songwriter, dancer, and choreographer
September 1 – Dann Hume, New Zealand musician, music producer, mix engineer and songwriter (Amy Shark) 
 Sevdaliza, Irish Dutch singer-songwriter and record producer
September 7 – Evan Rachel Wood, American singer and actress
September 8 - Wiz Khalifa, American rapper and singer
September 13 - Snoh Aalegra,  Swedish singer based in Los Angeles
September 16 – Sarah Hay, American ballerina and actress
September 19 - Sam Ellis (songwriter), Canadian singwriter and record producer
September 22 - Tom Felton, English actor and musician 
September 23 – Skylar Astin, American actor and singer
September 26 – Rosie Munter, Swedish vocalist and dancer
September 28
Hilary Duff, American singer, songwriter, author and actress (Married to Matthew Koma, Sister of Haylie Duff, Sutton Foster)  
Chloë Hanslip, English violinist
September 29 – Gryffin,  American musician, DJ, record producer.
October 3 – Starley (singer), Australian singer and songwriter
October 7 – Lauren Mayberry, Scottish singer, songwriter, writer and journalist (Chvrches)
October 17 – Stephanie (Kim Bo-kyung), American-born Korean pop singer (TSZX The Grace)
October 18 – Zac Efron, American actor, dancer, singer, musical star
October 28 – Frank Ocean, American singer-songwriter
October 29 – Tove Lo, Swedish singer-songwriter, dancer and activist
November 3 – Courtney Barnett, Australian singer/songwriter/musician
November 4
 Tim Douwsma, Dutch singer
 T.O.P, Korean rapper
November 5 – Kevin Jonas, American musician (Jonas Brothers)
November 10 – Charles Hamilton, American rapper and producer
November 24 – Sermstyle, English singer-songwriter, remixer, record producer and DJ
November 25 – Dolla, American rapper
November 29 – Cashmere Cat, Norwegian DJ, record producer, musician and turntablist (Ariana Grande) 
November 30 – Dougie Poynter, English bass guitarist (McFly)
December 1 – Vance Joy, Australian musician 
December 2 – Teairra Mari, American R&B singer-songwriter, dancer, model and actress
December 7 – Aaron Carter, American pop singer and rapper (D. 2022) 
December 14 - Alex Gaskarth, English born American singers-songwriter 
December 15 - Lady Leshurr,  British Hip hop grime dancehall rapper, singer, songwriter and producer
December 18 – Ayaka, Japanese pop singer
December 20 – Barrie-James O'Neill, Scottish singer-songwriter, worked with Lana Del Rey
December 25 – Julian Lage, American jazz guitarist
December 27 – Yui Okada, Japanese pop singer

Deaths
January 6 – Jaidev, Bollywood composer, 67
January 10 – Marion Hutton, singer and actress, 67
January 15 – Ray Bolger, Wizard of Oz actor, 83 (cancer)
January 30 – Harold Loeffelmacher, musician and bandleader (Six Fat Dutchmen), 81
February 2
Spike Hughes, jazz double bass player, composer and journalist, 78
Alfred Lion, record executive and co-founder of Blue Note Records, 78
February 4 – Liberace, US pianist, 67 (AIDS-related)
February 8 – Tony Destra, glam metal drummer, 32 (car accident)
February 18 – Dmitri Kabalevsky, composer
February 23 – Zeca Afonso, folk musician, 57
March 3 – Danny Kaye, actor, singer, dancer and comedian, 76
March 6 – Eddie Durham, jazz musician, 80
March 7 – Evelyn Dove, singer, 85
March 15 – Don Gant, singer/songwriter, record producer, 44 (complications following boating accident)
March 18 – Elizabeth Poston, composer, 82
March 20 – Rita Streich, coloratura soprano, 66
March 21
Dean Paul Martin, singer and actor, 35 (plane crash)
Robert Preston, actor and singer, 68
March 28 – Maria von Trapp, subject of The Sound of Music, 82
March 29 – Felix Prohaska, conductor
April 2 – Buddy Rich, jazz drummer, 69 (brain tumor)
April 7 – Carlton Barrett, reggae drummer (The Wailers), 36 (murdered)
April 14 – Karl Höller, composer, 79
May 2 – Larry Clinton, US bandleader and songwriter, 75
May 3 – Dalida, singer, actress and Miss Egypt 1954, 54 (suicide)
May 4 – Paul Butterfield, blues vocalist and harmonica player, 44 (drug overdose)
May 5 – Allen Jones, record producer (heart attack)
May 13
Signe Amundsen, operatic soprano, 87
Ismael Rivera, salsa composer and singer, 55 (heart attack)
May 14 – Rita Hayworth, dancer and film star, 68
May 24 – Hermione Gingold, actress and singer
May 26 – Robert Wilkins, blues guitarist and singer, 91
May 29 – Phyllis Tate, avant-garde composer, 76
June 3 – Andrés Segovia, guitar virtuoso, 94
June 18 – Kid Thomas Valentine, jazz trumpeter & bandleader, 91
June 21 – Abram Chasins, pianist and composer, 84
June 22
Fred Astaire, dancer, actor and singer, 88
Frank Rehak, jazz trombonist
June 25 – Boudleaux Bryant, Hall of Fame songwriter, 67
June 26 
Henk Badings, composer, 80
Gábor Rejtő, cellist, 70
July 1 – Snakefinger, guitarist, 38 (heart attack)
July 7 
Tibor Frešo, composer, 69
Germaine Thyssens-Valentin, pianist, 85 
July 10 – John Hammond, producer and musician, 76
July 15 – Pete King, drummer (After The Fire, BAP), 28 (testicular cancer)
July 25 – Alex Sadkin, saxophonist and record producer, 37 or 38 (motor accident)
July 26 – Joe Liggins, R&B, jazz and blues pianist, 72
August 2 – David Martin, bassist (Sam the Sham), 50 (heart attack)
August 12 – Sally Long, Ziegfeld Follies star, 85
August 14 – Vincent Persichetti, composer, 72
August 27
Bruce Holder, violinist, conductor and composer, 82
Scott La Rock, hip-hop DJ and producer, 25 (shot)
September 3 – Morton Feldman, composer, 51 (pancreatic cancer)
September 11 – Peter Tosh, reggae musician, 42 (shot and killed in a house invasion/robbery)
September 21 – Jaco Pastorius, jazz bassist, 35 (brain damage resulting from fight)
September 23 – Bob Fosse, dancer, choreographer and director of musicals, 60 (heart attack)
September 29 – Sebastian Peschko, pianist, 77
October 3 – Hans Gál, composer, 97
October 13 – Kishore Kumar, singer, actor, filmmaker, writer, musician and composer, 58
October 14 – Rodolfo Halffter, composer, 86
October 19 – Jacqueline du Pré, English cellist, 42 (multiple sclerosis)
October 28 – Woody Herman, US jazz clarinetist and bandleader, 74
November 12 – Cornelis Vreeswijk, Swedish singer-songwriter, 50 (liver cancer)
November 16 – Zubir Said, composer, 80
November 22 – Verna Arvey, librettist and pianist
November 23 – Joseph Beer, composer, 79
December 5 – Pappy Daily, country music entrepreneur and record producer, 85
December 8 – Annelies Kupper, operatic soprano, 81
December 10 – Jascha Heifetz, violinist
December 12 – Clifton Chenier, zydeco singer and accordionist, 62
December 18 – Conny Plank, record producer, 47
December 21 – John Spence, ska musician, 18 (suicide)
December 22 – Luca Prodan, rock musician, 34 (cirrhosis of the liver)
Unknown – Emani Sankara Sastry, veena player and composer, 65

Awards
The following artists are inducted into the Rock and Roll Hall of Fame: The Coasters, Eddie Cochran, Bo Diddley, Aretha Franklin, Marvin Gaye, Bill Haley, B. B. King, Clyde McPhatter, Ricky Nelson, Roy Orbison, Carl Perkins, Smokey Robinson, Big Joe Turner, Muddy Waters, and Jackie Wilson

Grammy Awards
Grammy Awards of 1987

Country Music Association Awards
1987 Country Music Association Awards

Eurovision Song Contest
Eurovision Song Contest 1987

Glenn Gould Prize
R. Murray Schafer (laureate)

Charts
List of Hot 100 number-one singles of 1987 (U.S.)

See also
 Record labels established in 1987

References

 
Music
20th century in music
Music by year